White Rabbits is an American six-piece indie rock band based in Brooklyn, New York, originally from Columbia, Missouri. The band released its debut studio album, Fort Nightly, on May 22, 2007. Their second album, It's Frightening, was released on May 19, 2009. They released their third album, Milk Famous, on March 6, 2012. The band is signed to TBD Records.

History
The band formed in Columbia, Missouri. The band's frontmen, Greg Roberts and Stephen Patterson, met at the college in 2004.  Alex Even, Adam Russell and Greg had formerly played in the band Texas Chainsaw Mass Choir. The original White Rabbits lineup consisted of five members, but after relocating to New York City the next year, the band expanded to six members. The sixth member, Jamie Levinson, had grown up on the same street as Roberts in Webster Groves, Missouri. Roberts and Levinson both played in a ska band (called The Hubcaps) while in high school.

The White Rabbits recorded its first studio album, Fort Nightly, and released it in 2007 to the public through Say Hey Records. The album was praised by critics.

In addition to consistent touring, they have been featured on NPR's World Cafe, where the band members discussed how they met and formed in the college town of Columbia, Missouri. They also talked about their early sound and performed three songs. They have also performed on the Late Show with David Letterman.

On May 12, 2009, the band released their second album, titled It's Frightening. The album was produced by Britt Daniel, lead singer and guitarist of Spoon (whom they asked after meeting the band while on tour in Minneapolis). Retrieved on February 16, 2009 The album was released on TBD Records, which also hosts the bands Radiohead and Underworld. The band also worked with Nicholas Vernhes at the Rare Book Room.

Their third album, titled Milk Famous, was released on March 6, 2012. The band entered a hiatus following the end of the tour in support of the album in December 2012. They reunited for a one-off show at Brooklyn's Cameo Gallery on June 15, 2014. Stephen Patterson and Greg Roberts played drums and bass guitar, respectively, in the touring band of former The Walkmen frontman Hamilton Leithauser in 2016 and 2017, with Patterson playing drums again for Leithauser in January 2020.

Live shows
White Rabbits are known for their energy onstage, their switching of instruments, and cover songs, notably Bob Dylan's "Maggie's Farm", which was also covered by one of the band's main influences, The Specials. Typically they will put their own twist on cover songs by playing them in a style/genre that is different from the original. After playing a particularly energetic show at South By Southwest in 2008, NME named them one of the top three bands performing that year.

They have toured with bands such as The Walkmen, Richard Swift, Interpol and Spoon. In 2007, they began a national tour with the Kaiser Chiefs in support of their album Fort Nightly. This followed a tour through the United Kingdom.  In 2010 the band went on tour with Interpol.

White Rabbits also performed at the 2010 Coachella Valley Music and Arts Festival on Saturday, April 17, 2010 on the main stage.  The following day, Stephen Patterson, along with Deerhunter frontman Bradford Cox, joined Spoon during their set for "Who Makes Your Money."
 
White Rabbits played at the 2010 Austin City Limits Music Festival and the 2010 Voodoo Music Experience in New Orleans Halloween weekend, and opened for Muse at London's Wembley Stadium on September 10, 2010. On October 29, 2010 they were the opening act for Interpol at the Verizon Wireless Theatre in Houston, TX.

They played on the BBC show Later... with Jools Holland, where they performed "Percussion Gun" and "They Done Wrong/We Done Wrong".

In 2012, they toured with The Shins.

Discography

Studio albums

Extended plays
 "White Rabbits Daytrotter Sessions" (7/16/2007, Daytrotter)
 "White Rabbits Daytrotter Sessions" (11/2/2009, Daytrotter)

Singles

Live recordings
 "White Rabbits: Live [In Spaceland - June 13, 2007]" (2007, Spaceland Recordings)
 "Live at Lollapalooza 2007: White Rabbits - EP" (2007)

Members
 Stephen Patterson – vocals, piano
 Alexander Even – guitar, vocals
 Matthew Clark – drums, additional percussion
 Jamie Levinson – drums
 Gregory Roberts – vocals, guitar
 Rustine Bragaw - bass

Former members
 Adam Russell – bass
 Brian Betancourt – bass

References

External links
Official website (snapshot)
Daytrotter Sessions - Downloadable MP3s
White Rabbits Interview nthWORD Magazine
Video session for 'They Shoot Music - Don't They'

Indie rock musical groups from Missouri
Musical groups from Columbia, Missouri
Mute Records artists